SM U-48 was one of the 329 submarines serving in the Imperial German Navy in World War I. 
U-48 was engaged in the naval warfare and took part in the First Battle of the Atlantic.

On 24 November 1917 she ran aground on Goodwin Sands. U-48 was scuttled and abandoned. HMS Gipsy continued to fire, killing 19. 17 were taken prisoner.

Summary of raiding history

References

Notes

Citations

Bibliography

World War I submarines of Germany
1915 ships
Ships built in Danzig
U-boats commissioned in 1916
Maritime incidents in 1917
U-boats scuttled in 1917
U-boats sunk by British warships
World War I shipwrecks in the North Sea
Type U 43 submarines